The Association pour la Taxation des Transactions financières et pour l'Action Citoyenne (Association for the Taxation of financial Transactions and Citizen's Action, ATTAC) is an activist organisation originally created to promote the establishment of a tax on foreign exchange transactions.

Background
Originally called "Action for a Tobin Tax to Assist the Citizen", ATTAC was a single-issue movement demanding the introduction of the so-called Tobin tax on currency speculation. ATTAC has enlarged its scope to a wide range of issues related to globalisation, and monitoring the decisions of the World Trade Organization (WTO), the Organisation for Economic Co-operation and Development (OECD,) and the International Monetary Fund (IMF). ATTAC representatives attend the meetings of the G8 with the goal of influencing policymakers' decisions. Attac spokesmen recently criticised Germany for what it called the criminalisation of anti-G8 groups.

At the founding, ATTAC had specific statutory objectives based on the promotion of the Tobin tax. For example, ATTAC Luxembourg specifies in article 1 of its statutes that it 
"aims to produce and communicate information, and to promote and carry out activities of all kinds for the recapture, by the citizens, of the power that the financial sector has on all aspects of political, economic, social and cultural life throughout the world. Such means include the taxation of transactions in foreign exchange markets (Tobin tax)."

ATTAC refutes claims that it is an anti-globalisation movement, but it criticises the neoliberal ideology that it sees as dominating economic globalisation. It supports those globalisation policies that their representatives characterise as sustainable and socially just. One of ATTAC's slogans is "The World is not for sale", denouncing the "merchandisation" of society. Another slogan is "Another world is possible", pointing to an alternative globalisation in which people and not profit is in focus.

James Tobin opposing ATTAC
Attac was founded to promote the Tobin tax by the Keynesian economist James Tobin. Tobin has said that Attac has misused his name. He says he has nothing in common with their goals and supports free trade — "everything that these movements are attacking. They're misusing my name."

Organisational history
In December 1997, Ignacio Ramonet wrote in Le Monde diplomatique an editorial in which he advocated the establishment of the Tobin tax and the creation of an organisation to pressure governments around the world to introduce the tax.  ATTAC was created on June 3, 1998, during a constitutive assembly in France.  While it was founded in France it now exists in over forty countries around the world.  In France, politicians from the left  are members of the association.   In Luxembourg, Francois Bausch of the left Green party is the founding politician in the association's initial member list.

ATTAC functions on a principle of decentralisation: local associations organise meetings, conferences, and compose documents that become counter-arguments to the perceived neoliberal discourse. ATTAC aims to formalise the possibility of an alternative to the neoliberal society that is currently required of globalisation. ATTAC aspires to be a movement of popular education.

Views on Attac and its members in different countries

Finland 
Communist Juhani Lohikoski, previously a chairman of Communist Youth League and Socialist League, served as the chairman of Finnish Attac for two terms (2002 - 2004). Yrjö Hakanen, chairman of the Communist Party of Finland, was a member of the board and a member of the founding committee. In March 2002 Aimo Kairamo, the long-time chief editor of the party organ of the Social Democrat Party, resigned from Attac and recommended the same decision for other social democrats because of the left-wing minority communists' leading positions. Soon also the social democrat foreign minister Erkki Tuomioja considered to follow Kairamo's example.

Sweden 
Researcher Malin Gawell covers the birth and development of Attac Sweden in her doctoral thesis on activist entrepreneurship. She suggests that Attac in Sweden was formed by people seeking a new way of organising with flat hierarchy, and with the strongly sensed need of making a change as the driving force.

From another perspective, Sydsvenskan newspaper suggested that the downturn of memberships in Swedish Attac after the hype in the beginning of 2001 may be due to its views on trade policies.

Issues and activities
The main issues covered by ATTAC today are:
 Control of financial markets (e.g., Tobin tax)
 "Fair" instead of "free" trade, via democratic control of the World Trade Organization and international financial institutions such the International Monetary Fund, Worldbank, European Union, North American Free Trade Agreement, Free Trade Area of the Americas, and G8.
 Defense of public goods - air, water, information
 Defense of public social services - like those relevant to health, social services, and social security.  For example, it is against the privatisation of pensions and of the health care system.  ATTAC has also taken a position on genetically modified organisms.  ATTAC also opposes General Agreement on Trade in Services.
 The struggle to end tax evasion (tax havens) as practiced by transnational corporations and rich individuals
 Sustainable globalisation
 Cancellation of the debt of Developing Countries.
 ATTAC campaigned against the Treaty establishing a Constitution for Europe.
 ATTAC is involved in fighting against climate change, for environmental justice and, especially, in supporting Alternatiba, Village of Alternatives.

In France, ATTAC associates with many other left-wing causes.

Nestlégate
In 2008, the Swiss multinational food and beverage company Nestlé was hit by a scandal which was later called Nestlégate by the media. Between the years 2003 and 2005, Nestlé hired the external Security company Securitas AG to spy on the Swiss branch of Attac. Nestlé started the monitoring when Attac Switzerland decided to work on a critical book about Nestlé.

In response to the Nestlégate, Attac Switzerland filed a lawsuit against Nestlé. The lawsuit was decided in favour of Attac in January 2013, as the personal rights of the observed were violated. They received a compensation for damages of 3000 Swiss francs each (about 3230 USD at the date of the proclamation of sentence).

See also
 Alter-globalisation
 Anti-globalisation
 Clearstream scandal, a clearing house (meta-bank) involved in one of the biggest financial scandals ever
 Currency transaction tax
 Financial transaction tax
 Global financial system
 MRAP, anti-racist NGO engaged in the creation of ATTAC
 Robin Hood tax
 Tobin tax
 Ireland as a tax haven

References

External links

 ATTAC official web site
 "Disarming the Markets", editorial by Ignacio Ramonet
 

Anti-globalization organizations
Political and economic think tanks based in France
Tax reform
1998 establishments in France
Organizations established in 1998
Financial transaction tax